The Wizards of Aus is an Australian television comedy series which began airing on SBS on 19 January 2016. The series is directed by and stars Australian filmmaker Michael Shanks and is produced by Chris Hocking, Nicholas Colla and Sumah Hurley. It is written by Michael Shanks and Nicholas Issell. It was originally devised as a six-part online series but instead became a three-part television series. A full 6-part version was released on YouTube on 18 February 2016.

Plot
Jack the Wizard (Michael Shanks), has had enough of the Magical Realm's obsession with large-scale fantasy warfare, and so decides to migrate to the western suburbs of Footscray, Melbourne. However, growing political tension coupled with endless trouble from fellow wizard Skulldrich make assimilation into human life more difficult.

Cast
 Michael Shanks as Jack
 Menik Gooneratne as Kylie 
 Mark Bonanno as Skulldrich

Guests
 Guy Pearce as Morgan Wright
 Bruce Spence as Regimand
 Samuel Johnson as Terry 
 Mark Mitchell as Senator Geoff Quinn
 Jared Daperis as Ghost Writer
 Liam McIntyre as Bronco the Slayer 
 Lucia Smyrk as Elsa 
 Nicholas Colla as Mr. Swinton
 Nicolette Minster as Mrs. Swinton
 Hannah Camilleri as Anna
 Mahalia Brown as Rebecca 
 Matylda Buczko as Megan 
 Nicholas Issell as Lord Mummy 
 Christie Whelan as Deborah Brickenwood 
 Rhys Mitchell as Batty
 Kyrie Capri as Lady Caroliniana 
 Jordan Raskopoulos as Marvolo
 Jackson McInerney as Zandark
 Stig Wemyss as Snot-Beak Fuck-Nuggs
 Wendy Bos as Dating Coordinator
 Paul Verhoeven as Horatio the Blower
 Ben Ridgwell as Frank Jilkins
 Liz Lethlean as Miranda Merhtens
 Michael Waugh	as Country Singer
 Daniel Daperis as West Guard
 Alistair Marks as Guard 1

References

External links
 

Special Broadcasting Service original programming
Australian comedy television series
2016 Australian television series debuts
Australian fantasy television series